The 1998 Hockey East Men's Ice Hockey Tournament was the 14th tournament in the history of the conference. It was played between March 12 and March 21, 1998. Quarterfinal games were played at home team campus sites, while the final four games were played at the Fleet Center in Boston, Massachusetts, the home venue of the NHL's Boston Bruins. By winning the tournament, Boston College received the Hockey East's automatic bid to the 1998 NCAA Division I Men's Ice Hockey Tournament.

Format
The tournament featured three rounds of play. The team that finishes ninth in the conference is not eligible for tournament play. In the first round, the first and eighth seeds, the second and seventh seeds, the third seed and sixth seeds, and the fourth seed and fifth seeds played a best-of-three with the winner advancing to the semifinals. In the semifinals, the highest and lowest seeds and second-highest and second-lowest seeds play a single elimination game, with the winner advancing to the championship game. The tournament champion receives an automatic bid to the 1998 NCAA Division I Men's Ice Hockey Tournament.

Conference standings
Note: GP = Games played; W = Wins; L = Losses; T = Ties; PTS = Points; GF = Goals For; GA = Goals Against

Bracket

Teams are reseeded after the quarterfinals

Note: * denotes overtime period(s)

Quarterfinals

(1) Boston University vs. (8) Merrimack

(2) Boston College vs. (7) Massachusetts

(3) New Hampshire vs. (6) Maine

(4) Northeastern vs. (5) Massachusetts-Lowell

Semifinals

(2) Boston College vs. (8) Merrimack

(5) Massachusetts-Lowell vs. (6) Maine

Championship

(2) Boston College vs. (6) Maine

Tournament awards

All-Tournament Team
F Jeff Farkas (Boston College)
F Steve Kariya (Maine)
F Marty Reasoner* (Boston College)
D Mike Mottau (Boston College)
D Darrel Scoville (Boston College)
G Alfie Michaud (Maine)
* Tournament MVP(s)

References

External links
Hockey East Online

Hockey East Men's Ice Hockey Tournament
HE tournament